The Turmberg (German: "Tower Hill") is a hill  (elevation: 256 m) located in Durlach, a suburb of Karlsruhe in Germany. It is home to a castle ruin.

The Turmberg can be reached by the Turmbergbahn, a funicular railway.  The original railway used water to counterbalance the rail cars, but now it is run on electricity.

Mountains and hills of Baden-Württemberg
Karlsruhe
Tourist attractions in Karlsruhe